West Azerbaijan Province is one of the 31 provinces of Iran, whose capital and largest city is Urmia. It is in the northwest of the country, bordered by Turkey (Ağrı, Hakkâri, Iğdır and Van Provinces), Iraq (Erbil and Sulaymaniyah Governorates) and Azerbaijan's Nakhchivan Autonomous Republic, as well as the provinces of East Azerbaijan, Zanjan and Kurdistan. The province is part of Region 3. It is separated from Armenia by Turkey's short border with the Azerbaijan Republic.

The province of West Azerbaijan covers an area of 39,487 km², or 43,660 km² including Lake Urmia. At the time of the National Census of 2006, the province had a population of 2,831,779 people in 655,260 households. The following census in 2011 counted 3,080,576 inhabitants in 822,152 households. At the latest census in 2016, the population had increased to 3,265,219 in 935,956 households.

Archaeology 
Permanent settlements were established in the province as early as the 6th millennium BC as excavation at sites such as Teppe Hasanlu establish. In Hasanlu, a famous Golden Vase was found in 1958. The province is the location of Tepe Hajji Firuz, site of some of the world's earliest evidence of wine production. Gooy Teppe is another significant site, where a metal plaque dating from 800 BC was found that depicts a scene from the Epic of Gilgamesh.

Ruins such as these and the UNESCO world heritage site at the Sasanian compound of Takht-i-Suleiman illustrate the strategic importance and tumultuous history of the province through the millennia. Overall, the province enjoys a wealth of historical attractions, with 169 sites registered by the Cultural Heritage Organization of Iran.

History 

The major known ancient civilization in the region was that of Mannaeans, a buffer state between Urartian and Assyrian sphere of influence. Mannaeans in turn spoke a language related to Urartian. After the fall of Assyria, the region was known as Mantiene (or Matiene) in Greek sources. Matiene bordered on Atropatene situated east of Lake Urmia.

The region is known as Vaspurakan and Nor Shirakan in Armenian history and made up an important part of historical Armenia, functioning as one of the cradles of Armenian civilisation. On 26 May 451 AD, a very important battle was fought that would prove  pivotal in Armenian history. On the Avarayr Plain, at what is modern-day Churs in the West Azerbaijan Province, the Armenian army under Vardan Mamikonian clashed with the Sasanian one. Although the Persians were victorious on the battlefield itself, the battle proved to be a major strategic victory for Armenians, as Avarayr paved the way to the Nvarsak Treaty (484 AD), which affirmed Armenia's right to practice Christianity freely.

In the late 4th century AD the Sasanians incorporated the area into the neighbouring Adhurpadagan satrapy to the east. The name Adhurpadagan, later Arabicized to Azerbaijan, derives from Atropates, an Iranian satrap of Media under the Achaemenid empire, who later was reinstated as the satrap of Media under Alexander of Macedonia.

In the 7th century this area was under Islamic rule. After Babak Khorramdin revolted, the grip of the Abbasid caliphate weakened, allowing some native dynasties to rise. By the first half of the 11th century, the Byzantine emperors were actively trying to round off their eastern territories, in an attempt to absorb the unstable Armenian dynasties. In 1021-1022 emperor Basil II led his army as far as Khoy within 175 km of Dvin, and obtained the surrender of royalty from the Artsruni dynasty of Van. The Seljuk Turkic tribes, who the local Hadhabani Kurds initially resisted, eventually conquered the region in the 11th and early 12th centuries. During Timurid rule in the 14th century, Khoy gained an important role in all over the region. After Hadhabanis, three other Kurdish principalities, Mukriyans in the southern part, Bradosti in the middle, and Donboli in the northern part ruled the region for centuries, who temporarily sided with either the Ottomans or Safavids. The battle of DimDim between the Safavids and local Bradosti Kurds took place in this region. After a long and bloody siege led by the Safavid grand vizier Hatem Beg, which lasted from November 1609 to the summer of 1610, the Castle of Dimdim was captured. All the defenders were killed and Shah Abbas I ordered a general massacre in Bradost and Mukriyan (reported by Eskandar Beg, Safavid historian in the book Alam Aray-e Abbasi) and resettled the Afshar tribe in the region while deporting many Kurdish tribes to Khorasan region, where many of their descendants still reside of as of today.

The Safavid control was firmly restored by Shah Abbas but during the Afghan invasion (1722–1728) more than a century later, the Ottomans captured the northwestern regions of Iran, until Nadir Shah expelled them and reasserted Iranian suzerainty over the region and far beyond. The Russian (Tsarist) army occupied the region in 1909, and again in 1912–1914 and 1915–1918 period. The Ottomans occupied the region in 1914–1915 and 1918–1919 periods. The Soviet forces occupied the region in 1941, resulting in the establishment of a short-lived, Soviet-supported puppet state called the Republic of Mahabad, from November 1945 to November 1946.

The districts of Maku, Khoy, Salmas, and Arasbaran, and the region of Urmia, according to 19th-century administrative division became a part of the northwestern Iranian province of Azerbaijan. In 1937 the province was renamed to  Shomal-e gharb (northwestern province)
Shortly after it the province of Azerbaijan was divided into a western and eastern part which were renamed to Chaharom (fourth province) and sevom (third province), respectively. In 1961 Fourth province was renamed West Azerbaijan by the Iranian authorities.

Some events in the 19th and 20th centuries are:
 Shaikh Ubeidullah Attacks, west and south of Lake Urmia in 1880;
 Simko Insurrections, west of Lake Urmia from 1918  to 1922;
 The Soviet occupation in 1944;
 The foundation and destruction of the Azerbaijan People's Government in 1945-1946;
 The foundation and destruction of the Republic of Mahabad in 1946 in County of Mahabad;
 Periodic severe fighting from 1979 until the 1990s near to boundaries of Iraq-Iran between Kurdish militia belonging to Kurdish political parties and the Iranian government. During the early 1980s parts of the province were outside central government's control.

Zoroaster claim 
Some Muslim researchers have proclaimed that the birth of the prophet Zoroaster was in this area, in the vicinity of Lake Orumieh, Chichest or Ganzak; recent scholarship, however, indicates that sites in Central Asia are more likely.

Geography and climate 
With an area of 43,660 square kilometers, including Lake Urmia, the province of West Azerbaijan is located on the northwest of Iran.

Cold northern winds affect the province during winter and cause heavy snow. According to existing meteorological data, local temperatures vary within the province. Average temperature differs from 9.4 °C in Piranshahr to 11.6 °C in Mahabad, while it is 9.8 °C in Urmia, 10.8 °C in Khoy, 9.4 °C in Piranshahr, and in Mahabad 11.6 °C. According to the same data, the highest temperature in the province reaches 34 °C in July, and the lowest temperature is –16 °C in January. The maximum change of temperature in summer is 4 °C and in winter 15 °C.

Administrative divisions

Cities 

According to the 2016 census, 2,136,203 people (over 65% of the population of West Azerbaijan province) live in the following cities: Avajiq 1,663, Baruq 4,225, Bazargan 9,979, Bukan 193,501, Chahar Borj 9,406, Dizaj Diz 8,282, Firuraq 9,190, Gerd Kashaneh 4,201, Ivughli 3,320, Keshavarz 4,138, Khalifan 749, Khoy 198,845, Mahabad 168,393, Mahmudabad 6,866, Maku 46,581, Marganlar 2,294, Miandoab 134,425, Mirabad 6,000, Mohammadyar 9,313, Nalus 2,973, Naqadeh 81,598, Nazok-e Olya 2,667, Nushin 8,380, Oshnavieh 39,801, Piranshahr 91,515, Poldasht 11,472, Qarah Zia od Din 26,767, Qatur 5,147, Qushchi 2,787, Rabat 15,750, Salmas 92,811, Sardasht 46,412, Serow 1,800, Shahin Dezh 43,131, Showt 25,381, Siah Cheshmeh 17,804, Silvaneh 1,614, Simmineh 1,345, Takab 49,677, Tazeh Shahr 8,629, Urmia 736,224, and Zurabad 1,147.

Cities and larger towns

Demographics 

There are no official statistics on the ethnic or linguistic makeup of Western Azerbaijan. Most of the population of the province consists of Azerbaijanis and Kurds, with smaller populations of Armenians, Assyrians, and Jews. On the question of linguistic majority of the province, linguist Anonby argued in 2019 that:

Distribution 
The counties of Bukan, Mahabad, Oshnavieh, Piranshahr and Sardasht are populated by Kurds, while Chaldoran, Maku, Miandoab, Naqadeh, Salmas and Takab have a mixed population of both Azerbaijanis and Kurds. Salmas moreover has a Christian minority.

Higher education 
Urmia University was first built by an American Presbyterian missionary in 1878. A medical faculty was also established there headed by Joseph Cochran and a team of American medical associates. Cochran and his colleagues were buried in an old cemetery in the vicinity of Urmia. Urmia University website says this about them:

"There they lie in peace away from their homeland, and the testimonial epitaphs on their tombs signify their endeavor and devotion to humanity."

The province today has the following major institutes of higher education:
 Urmia University 
 Urmia University of Medical Sciences
 Urmia University of Technology
 Islamic Azad University of Urmia
 Islamic Azad University of Salmas
 Islamic Azad University of Khoi
 Islamic Azad University of Piranshahr
 Islamic Azad University of Mahabad

References

External links

Official website of West Azerbaijan Governor’s Office
West Azerbaijan’s Government Portal
Urmia sport news agency
West Azerbaijan Provincial Management Organization 
West Azerbaijan Cultural Heritage Organization
Recent photos from Azerbaijan
Lake Urmia UNESCO Biosphere Reserve

 
Provinces of Iran
Iranian Kurdistan